Avenida Brasil (English: Brazil Avenue) is a Brazilian primetime telenovela created by João Emanuel Carneiro. It premiered on 26 March 2012 and ended on 19 October 2012 on TV Globo at 9 pm timeslot.

It was written by João Emanuel Carneiro in collaboration with Antonio Silver, Luciana Pessanha, Alessandro Marson, Marcia Prates and Thereza Falcão and direction of Gustavo Fernandez, Thiago Teitelroit Paul Silvestrini, Andrew Hall and Joan Jabace and directed by José Luiz Villamarim and Amora Mautner and the core direction, Ricardo Waddington.

Starring Débora Falabella, Adriana Esteves, Murilo Benício, Cauã Reymond, Marcello Novaes and Eliane Giardini.

The telenovela achieved an overall average of 42 rating points and a 69% share. The last episode scored an impressive 56 rating points and an 84% share, with more than 50 million (sic) viewers, becoming the most watched TV program of the year, and was considered by Forbes the most-commercially successful telenovela in Brazilian history, with total earnings estimated in $1 billion. The telenovela obtained a total of 118 indications to prizes, being victorious in 41 of these.

In 2013, Avenida Brasil obtained 1 nomination to the 41st International Emmy Awards in the Best Telenovela category.

Plot 
The plot follows the dramatic story of Rita (Débora Falabella), a sweet young woman who struggles to recover part of the life her ruthless gold digging stepmother, Carminha (Adriana Esteves), took from her when she was only a child.

When Rita's father dies accidentally and prematurely at the hand of Tufão (Murilo Benício) but directly related to Carminha's scheme, Carminha and her lover, Max (Marcello Novaes), send the young girl off to live in a landfill, so that she doesn't stand in the way of their plan to get rich. Carminha uses this fact to trap Tufão into a guilt ridden marriage unknowingly.  Rita at the landfill is subjected to child labor under the control of a deplorable man, named Nilo (José de Abreu). But, she is lucky enough to meet Batata (Cauã Reymond), a boy who becomes her best friend and true love. He takes her to live with other children, under the care of motherly Lucinda (Vera Holtz), in another house at the landfill. Fortunately, Rita is soon adopted and moves out of the country to Argentina with a nice family who changes her name to Nina.  However, she has issues with her adoptive mother who passes away and eventually with her adoptive sisters because of her mission of revenge. Rita/Nina's adoptive father loved her very much and treated her well.  He educated her and provided for his family nicely.  She becomes a famous chef.  When her adoptive father dies it intensifies her loss of her natural father and revenge for Carminha and Max.  Batata is adopted by Carminha and Tufão and they rename him Jorginho. Jorginho has many emotional issues because his birth mother adopts him years after she abandons him at the landfilled as a toddler.   Jorginho despises Caminha but he doesn't know why and he does not remember her clearly from his early childhood before the abandonment.

Years later, unrecognizable and motivated by vengeance, Nina moves back to Brazil under her adoptive name, she infiltrates the family by becoming the personal chef for Carminha's family. Eventually, she must face the bitter consequences of seeking revenge against those who hurt her the most. As mentioned above, vile Carminha has managed to lure and marry Tufão who is a friendly, rich football player and is unaware of her many lies and manipulations. They live with his loud and garish relatives in an unrefined suburban mansion and, underhandedly, she makes the evil Max her brother-in-law by marrying him to Tufão's annoying sister.

Together, Carminha and Max continue to carry out their sadistic plans to get ahead while continuing their love/hate affair in the same house as their unsuspecting spouses.  Nina becomes so engrossed in her single-minded goal to inflict suffering and punishment on those who wronged her that her own happiness is jeopardized. Carminha and Nina have one thing in common: their earnest love for Jorginho, who is Carminha's biological son (and adoptive son) and Nina's childhood sweetheart, Batata.

Nina uses Max and become entangled, which irritates Carminha for her loss of love interest. Subsequently, Nina helps Max by giving ransom with interest for her kin. Day-to-day Max demands money, Nina finally is unable to help him and Max realizes that she doesn't love him. Devastated Max agrees to Carminha for overwhelming Nina. Soon after, Nina stealthily takes a picture of themselves on their bed – threatens Carminha . The photo still used to evidence to displaying for Tufão until Carminiha tactically steals from Nina's cache and announces the identity of Nina for Tufão's family. Tufão confuses but tend to believe Carminha's statement, with Nina no hope to describe what she is. Upon Max convincing Carminha to leave the mansion, she betrays him to death-trap from drowning him in his boat but timely survived by his mother Lucinda. Max disguises and manages to reveal Nina's photo to Tufão family at which Carminha is fired. The big event is that Max kidnaps Nina, soon dead Nilo, Lucinda, Carminha and Jorginio. At that time, Max uses Nina as a human shield for escape, but someone repeatedly knocks unconscious and kills him using a spade. Carminha swears about the murder of Max and is sentenced three years. The later series shows Carminha returning from jail and reconciling to Nina.

Production

Opening sequence 
The opening was created by director Alexandre Pit Ribeiro, which featured 135 dancers dancing on a catwalk. The choreography was produced by Dudu Neles.

The opening theme is a re-recording of Vem Dançar Kuduro with new Portuguese lyrics, adapted to the Brazilian market. It was played by Robson Moura and Lino Krizz, and known for its refrain "Oi Oi Oi", which became successful in social networks.

Cast

Impact

Ratings

National reception 
The soap opera had a successful run, increasingly becoming a critical and commercial success. It became a popular subject on social media. On the night of its final chapter, it topped Twitter's trending topics worldwide. The last chapter notoriously ceased major activities in Brazil, when the streets of big cities as São Paulo and Rio de Janeiro were deserted. Rede Globo's programming had segments dedicated to the soap opera and several other Brazilian television networks also commented on its end. With the high number of television sets tuned in, a hoax quickly spread about a possible nationwide blackout after the broadcast, due to an effect called "loading ramp", where people resume activities which could generate an electricity overload, leaving the country in the dark. However, this did not actually occur. The last chapter was watched by 80 million people, making it the highest rated Brazilian television program in 2012.

Portugal 
Besides the success in Brazil, Avenida Brasil, is also a big hit with the audience in Portugal. In its debut, 24 September 2012, the novel has recorded 13 points and 31.6% audience share, finishing third in the ranking of hearings that day. Week after week, the soap opera continued to record satisfactory levels of audience. On 15 November 2012 Avenida Brasil recorded 11.4 points and an audience share of 36%, meaning that one in three televisions were watching a telenovela. It was the fourth most watched program each day. On 3 January 2013 it was registering 15.9 points and an audience share of 36.6%, the largest audience to date. It remained fourth place in the rankings.

Awards and nominations

The cast received 108 nominations and won 36 awards. João Emanuel Carneiro, Adriana Esteves, Murilo Benício and Mel Maia were the most prized.

Broadcast

Avenida Brasil has become the most exported telenovela made by Rede Globo, surpassing Da Cor do Pecado (ibid), which was the prior sales leader for other countries.

The telenovela has been licensed by more than 150 countries, including all of Latin America, the United States, South Korea, Armenia, Sweden and Guatemala, being dubbed into 19 languages.

Reception
In Portugal it received 16.1 points and a 39% audience share for the last chapter, which means more than 1.5 million viewers watched the outcome of the novela. The plot debuted in SIC in September 2012 and was leader of the time in which it was displayed. It was one of the most watched programs in the country, second only to "Dancin' Days", co-produced by Globo and SIC. The telenovela has also good viewing figures in Greece, Croatia, Hungary and Kosovo Argentina reached an average of 12 points with peaks of 13.3 in its first chapter, ensuring impressive viewing figures for Telefe.

Soundtrack

Nacional 

 Cover Murilo Benício

Nacional Vol. 2 

 Cover Débora Falabella

Internacional 

 Cover Cauã Reymond

Notes

References

External links 
  
 

 
2012 Brazilian television series debuts
2012 Brazilian television series endings
2012 telenovelas
TV Globo telenovelas
Brazilian telenovelas
Telenovelas by João Emanuel Carneiro
Television shows set in Rio de Janeiro (city)
Portuguese-language telenovelas
Television series about revenge